Addi Asme’e  is a reservoir located in the Kola Tembien woreda of the Tigray Region in Ethiopia. The earthen dam that holds the reservoir was built in 1994, with a dam crest length of 287 metres.

Environment 
The reservoir suffers from rapid siltation. The lithology of the catchment is Precambrian metamorphic rock.

References 

1994 establishments in Ethiopia

Reservoirs in Ethiopia
Tigray Region